Leila Ouahabi El Ouahabi (born 22 March 1993) is a Spanish professional footballer who plays as a left-back for Women's Super League club Manchester City and the Spain national team. She is regarded as one of the finest left-back players in the world.

Born in Catalonia, Ouahabi played youth football with Barcelona before being elevated to become a first team player for the 2011–12 season. She left Barcelona to join Valencia in 2013, before returning to the club in 2016. She had won numerous accolades with Barcelona, which includes the UEFA Women's Champions League, Primera División, and Copa de la Reina. She left Barcelona to joined Manchester City in the summer of 2022. 

A full international since 2016, Ouahabi had represented the Spain national team in the 2019 FIFA Women's World Cup and the UEFA Women's Euro 2022.

Early life
Ouahabi was born in Mataró, Catalonia to a family of Moroccan origin. Growing up, she would play futsal with her brother and at one point joined a futsal team of eleven other boys. The first club she joined was a girl's youth team of the club UE Vilassar de Mar.

Club career

Barcelona 
Ouahabi was thirteen when she joined Barcelona's youth teams in 2007. After five years of elevating through the ranks of La Masia, she became a first-team player for the 2011–12 season. This season saw Barcelona achieve their first ever league title win. Ouahabi was frustrated with a lack of playing time after playing a second year in the Spanish Primera División with Barcelona.

Valencia 
She joined Valencia in 2013, where she remained until 2016.

Return to Barcelona 
In the summer of 2016, Ouahabi re-signed with Barcelona from Valencia.

She won three Primera División titles, five Copa de la Reina titles, two Supercopa de España titles and the UEFA Women's Champions League in her second spell at Barcelona, including the continental treble of Primera División, Copa de la Reina and Champions League in 2021.

Manchester City
Ouahabi joined Manchester City from Barcelona in 2022 on a two-year deal. She made her club debut in a UEFA Women's Champions League tie against FC Tomiris Turan on 19 August 2022

International career

Ouahabi has played for Spain's U19 national team.

Ouahabi earned her first senior national team callup in February 2016 under newly appointed Spain coach Jorge Vilda. A month later, Ouahabi made her senior international debut for Spain on 4 March 2016, starting a 0–0 friendly draw with Romania in Mogoșoaia.

In February 2017, Ouahabi was called up to the Spain squad for the 2017 Algarve Cup, her first call-up for a senior national team tournament. Her first international goal turned out to be the winning goal in the 2017 Algarve Cup final against Canada.

At the 2019 Women's World Cup Ouahabi started one group stage match, a 0–0 draw against China. The draw was enough to get them past the group stages for the first time in Spain's history where they would then face the United States in the Round of 16. Ouahabi started that Round of 16 match, where Spain had a convincing performance but lost 1–2 against the eventual tournament winners. She ended the tournament having played 180 minutes.

Career Statistics

Club

International 

Scores and results list Spain's goal tally first, score column indicates score after each Ouahabi goal.

Honours

Club
FC Barcelona
Primera División: 2011–12, 2012–13, 2019–20, 2020–21, 2021–22
UEFA Women's Champions League: 2020–21 
Copa de la Reina: 2011, 2013, 2017, 2018, 2019–20, 2020–21, 2021–22
Supercopa Femenina: 2019–20, 2021–22
Copa Catalunya: 2017, 2018, 2019

International
Spain
Algarve Cup: Winner, 2017

Notes

References

External links 
 Leila Ouahabi at BDFutbol
 
 
 
 

1993 births
Living people
Spanish women's footballers
Footballers from Catalonia
Spain women's international footballers
Primera División (women) players
FC Barcelona Femení players
People from Mataró
Sportspeople from the Province of Barcelona
Spanish sportspeople of Moroccan descent
Valencia CF Femenino players
Women's association football fullbacks
UE Vilassar de Mar players
2019 FIFA Women's World Cup players
FC Barcelona Femení B players
Sportswomen from Catalonia
UEFA Women's Euro 2022 players
UEFA Women's Euro 2017 players
Expatriate sportspeople in England
21st-century Spanish women